The Lion of Judah is a 2011 South African-American computer-animated Christian comedy-drama film produced by Animated Family Films, distributed by Rocky Mountain Pictures and starring Scott Eastwood, Georgina Cordova, Sandi Patty, Anupam Kher, Michael Madsen, Alphonso McAuley, Omar Benson Miller, Vic Mignogna and Ernest Borgnine. It is the sequel to the  Christmas short film Once Upon A Stable, taking place 30 years earlier in a Bethlehem stable as The Stable-Mates witness the birth of "The King". Lion of Judah had a limited release to theaters starting June 3, 2011, and a domestic DVD release Easter 2012.

Synopsis
During the time of Jesus' crucifixion, a lamb named Judah tries to avoid being sacrificed. His friends from the stable in Bethlehem embark on a journey to save their friend.

Cast
 Bruce Marchiano as Jesus
 Georgina Cordova as Judah, the lamb
 Ernest Borgnine as Slink, a rat
 Anupam Kher as Monty, a horse
 Sandi Patty as Esmay, a cow
 Michael Madsen as Boss, a raven
 Omar Benson Miller as Horace, a pig
 Vic Mignogna as Raven #1
 Rodney Newman as Raven #2 
 Alphonso McAuley as Drake, a rooster
 Scott Eastwood as Jack, a donkey
 Leon Clingman as Tony
 Roger Hawkins as Hornsby
 Matthew Rutherford as Wallace
 Adrienne Pearce as Helda, a hen
 Samantha Gray as Judah's Mother
 David Magidoff as Peter
 Serena Porter as The Maiden

Production
The film was animated in stereoscopic 3D at Character Matters Animation Studio in Cape Town. It was originally meant to be released in 2009, but it was delayed to 2011 due to its production issues, it was released in United States by the independent Florida-based company Rocky Mountain Pictures on June 3, 2011.

Reception
The film was panned by critics; it has a 0% on Rotten Tomatoes.

Home media
The Lion of Judah was released on DVD and Blu-ray Disc by Warner Home Video on March 27, 2012.

See also
 List of animated feature films
 List of computer-animated films

References

External links
 
 
 
 

2011 films
American computer-animated films
2011 computer-animated films
2011 3D films
Christian animation
2010s American animated films
3D animated films
South African animated films
Animated films about rats
Films about sheep
2010s English-language films